The 2018–19 Michigan Wolverines men's hockey team was the Wolverines' 97th season. They represented the University of Michigan in the 2018–19 NCAA Division I men's ice hockey season. The team was coached by Mel Pearson, in his second year as head coach, and played their home games at Yost Ice Arena.

Previous season
During the 2017–18 ice hockey season Michigan went 22–15–3, including 11–10–3 in Big Ten Play. Michigan lost in the semifinals of the 2018 Big Ten Men's Ice Hockey Tournament to Ohio State by a score of 3 to 2 in overtime. Michigan qualified for the 2018 NCAA Division I Men's Ice Hockey Tournament as the #2 seed in the Northeast Regional. They beat Northeastern by a score of 3-2 in the first round of the tournament. Then they went on to beat Boston University 6 to 3 in the Regional Final. Michigan advanced to the Frozen Four for the first time since 2011, but lost to Notre Dame in the National Semifinals after captain Jake Evans scored the game-winning goal with six seconds remaining.

When the team reached the Frozen Four it marked the sixth time a school had reached the final four of the NCAA Men's Ice Hockey Championship and NCAA Division I men's basketball tournament in the same season: Michigan (1964, 1992*, 1993* and 2018) and Michigan State (1999 and 2001).

Roster
As of September 28, 2018

Coaching Staff

Standings

Schedule and Results

|-
!colspan="8" style=""| Regular season

|-
! colspan="9" style=""|Big Ten Tournament

References

External links
 Official Website

Michigan ice hockey
Michigan ice hockey
Michigan Wolverines men's ice hockey seasons
Michigan